Eremophila glabra subsp. South Coast is a plant in the figwort family, Scrophulariaceae and is endemic to Western Australia.  It is similar to other shrubs in the species Eremophila glabra but is distinguished from them mainly by the outer surface of its petal tube, which is covered with glandular hairs. It has not been formally described but is a distinct subspecies, restricted to the Ravensthorpe district.

Description
Eremophila glabra subsp. The leaves are grey-green and hairy, sometimes with a few indistinct teeth near their tips.

The flowers are yellow, orange or reddish-orange and occur singly in the leaf axils. The lowest petal lobe is narrower that the rest and is turned back below the flower. Flowering occurs from August to December.

Taxonomy and naming
Eremophila glabra subsp. South Coast has not been formally described.

Distribution and habitat
Eremophila glabra subsp. South Coast is only known from the Ravensthorpe area where it grows in red-brown clay soil.

References

Flora of Western Australia
glabra
Undescribed plant species